Eleutherodactylus patriciae is a species of frog in the family Eleutherodactylidae endemic to the Cordillera Central, Dominican Republic, at elevations of  asl. Its natural habitats are closed upland forest and forest remnants.
It is threatened by habitat loss caused by agriculture and by disturbance from ecotourism. Also chytridiomycosis is a threat.

References

patriciae
Endemic fauna of the Dominican Republic
Amphibians of the Dominican Republic
Amphibians described in 1965
Taxonomy articles created by Polbot